Bağçakürd  (also, Bagçakürd, Badçakürd, Bakhchakyurd) is a village and municipality in the Goranboy Rayon of Azerbaijan.  It has a population of 1,597.

References 

Populated places in Goranboy District